Svanström is a Swedish surname. As of February 2012, 1752 people in Sweden have this surname. Notable people with the surname include:
Fredrik Svanström, Finnish athlete
Kurt Svanström, Swedish football player
Leif Svanström, Swedish epidemiologist
Yvonne Svanström, Swedish prostitution researcher

References

Swedish-language surnames